Kongu Desa Makkal Katchi (KDMK) is a political party in the Indian state of Tamil Nadu. The party's vote base is mainly concentrated in the Kongu Nadu region of Tamil Nadu.

References

Political parties in Tamil Nadu
Political parties established in 2014
2014 establishments in Tamil Nadu